The House of Vučić or Volzio was a noble family from the city of Dubrovnik and the Republic of Ragusa.

See also 
 Dubrovnik
 Republic of Ragusa
 Dalmatia
 Aleksandar Vučić

References 

Ragusan noble families